The 1989 Bordeaux Open also known as the Grand Prix Passing Shot was a men's tennis tournament played on clay courts at Villa Primrose in Bordeaux in France that was part of the 1989 Nabisco Grand Prix. It was the 12th edition of the tournament and was held from 25 September until 29 September 1989. First-seeded Ivan Lendl won the singles title.

Finals

Singles
 Ivan Lendl defeated  Emilio Sánchez 6–2, 6–2
 It was Lendl's 8th singles title of the year and the 81st of his career.

Doubles
 Tomás Carbonell /  Carlos di Laura defeated  Agustín Moreno /  Jaime Yzaga 6–4, 6–3

References

External links
 ITF tournament edition details

Bordeaux Open
ATP Bordeaux
Bordeaux Open
Bordeaux Open